Saqib Mahmood (born 25 February 1997) is an English cricketer who plays for England and Lancashire. Primarily he is a right-arm fast bowler. He made his international Twenty20 debut for England in November 2019, with his Test debut in March 2022.

Early and domestic career
Mahmood was born in Birmingham, England, to Pakistani parents who belong to the Mirpuri diaspora, with roots in Kashmir.

In April 2019, Mahmood became the first bowler for Lancashire to take a five-wicket haul in successive List A matches, when he did so in the 2019 Royal London One-Day Cup.

In May 2021, Mahmood took his maiden five-wicket haul in first-class cricket, with 5/47 in the 2021 County Championship match against Yorkshire.

In April 2022, he was bought by the Oval Invincibles for the 2022 season of The Hundred. However, the following month he was ruled out of the rest of the season after suffering a back stress fracture.

Mahmood is a Liverpool FC fan.

International career
In September 2019, Mahmood was named in England's Test and Twenty20 International (T20I) squads for their series against New Zealand.

Mahmood made his T20I debut for England, against New Zealand, on 3 November 2019.

Mahmood made his ODI debut for England, against South Africa, on 9 February 2020.

In August 2021, Mahmood was added to England's squad for the second Test against India, after Stuart Broad was ruled out of the rest of the series due to injury. In February 2022, Mahmood was again named in England's Test squad, this time for their series against the West Indies.

Mahmood made his Test debut on 16 March 2022, for England against the West Indies.

Playing style
As a result of Mahmood's bowling action, his pace (up to 90 mph), his use of reverse-swing and yorkers, especially during the death-overs, he has been compared to Waqar Younis.

References

External links
 

1997 births
Living people
English cricketers
England Test cricketers
England One Day International cricketers
England Twenty20 International cricketers
Cricketers from Birmingham, West Midlands
Lancashire cricketers
North v South cricketers
English people of Pakistani descent
English people of Mirpuri descent
British sportspeople of Pakistani descent
British Asian cricketers
English cricketers of the 21st century
Oval Invincibles cricketers
Sydney Thunder cricketers
Peshawar Zalmi cricketers